Sumner Township may refer to:

Illinois
 Sumner Township, Kankakee County, Illinois
 Sumner Township, Warren County, Illinois

Iowa
 Sumner Township, Buchanan County, Iowa
 Sumner Township, Iowa County, Iowa
 Sumner Township, Webster County, Iowa
 Sumner Township, Winneshiek County, Iowa

Kansas
 Sumner Township, Osborne County, Kansas, in Osborne County, Kansas
 Sumner Township, Phillips County, Kansas, in Phillips County, Kansas
 Sumner Township, Reno County, Kansas, in Reno County, Kansas
 Sumner Township, Sumner County, Kansas, in Sumner County, Kansas

Michigan
 Sumner Township, Michigan

Minnesota
 Sumner Township, Fillmore County, Minnesota

North Carolina
 Sumner Township, Guilford County, North Carolina, in Guilford County, North Carolina

Oklahoma
 Sumner Township, Garfield County, Oklahoma, in Garfield County, Oklahoma

South Dakota
 Sumner Township, Spink County, South Dakota, in Spink County, South Dakota

See also

Sumner (disambiguation)

Township name disambiguation pages